Bythinellidae is a family of small freshwater snails with an operculum, aquatic gastropod molluscs in the order Littorinimorpha.

Their minute shell is often colored. They are characterized by a calcareous operculum, a lobe on the upper surface of the neck. The ctenidium, the respiratory gill-comb, is very broad. They have a ciliary feeding habit. The kidney has a large extension towards the mantle.

Genera
Genera in the family Bythinellidae include:
 Bythinella Moquin-Tandon, 1856
 Strandzhia Georgiev & Glöer, 2013
 Terrestribythinella Sitnikova, Starobogatov & V. Anistratenko, 1992
Genera brought into synonymy
 Acrophlyctis Cossmann, 1888 †: synonym of Bythinella (Acrophlyctis) Cossmann, 1888 † represented as Bythinella Moquin-Tandon, 1856
 Bithinella [sic]: synonym of Bythinella Moquin-Tandon, 1856 (incorrect subsequent spelling)
 Bithynella Moquin-Tandon, 1856: synonym of Bythinella Moquin-Tandon, 1856 (incorrect subsequent spelling)
 Bythynella: synonym of Bythinella Moquin-Tandon, 1856 (invalid: incorrect subsequent spelling)
 Microna Frauenfeld, 1863: synonym of Bythinella Moquin-Tandon, 1856

References

External links 
 Wilke T., Haase M., Hershler R., Liu H.-P., Misof B. & Ponder W. (2013) Pushing short DNA fragments to the limit: Phylogenetic relationships of ‘hydrobioid' gastropods (Caenogastropoda: Rissooidea). Molecular Phylogenetics and Evolution, 66: 715-736